Calvin Cylk Cozart (born February 1, 1960) is an American actor, director, writer and producer who has appeared in over 30 films and 20 television shows.

Early life

Cozart was born and raised in Knoxville, Tennessee.  His father is African American and his mother is Native American (Cherokee).

In his high school years, he was a talented football and basketball player. He attended Montreat-Anderson College, in Montreat, North Carolina, for his freshman year, then transferred to King College in Bristol, Tennessee, on a basketball scholarship.

Career
After college, Cozart almost made a professional career out of basketball, but he suffered a foot injury in the NBA's Summer Pro League in Los Angeles, California. A demonstration of his basketball skills can be seen in the film White Men Can't Jump, which also starred actors Wesley Snipes and Woody Harrelson.

Prior to becoming an actor, Cozart was an established and very successful model working in Miami, Florida.

Some of his most prominent roles are Detective Jimmy Mulvey opposite Bruce Willis in 16 Blocks, Steven Spielberg's Eagle Eye, and the family feature film, Adrift.

Cozart co-created and produced, "Spirit of Life",  for the 2000 Summer Paralympic Games in Sydney, Australia. "Spirit of Life" earned a Videographer Award, Aurora Award, NY Film Festival Bronze Award, and Telly Award. Cozart is the Director of Entertainment/Education for his foundation, Keeping Dreams Alive, which focuses on mentoring children and teenagers from junior high school through College. “Our Foundation is for all sports. KDA will help find Scholarships for the kids that have fallen through the cracks of life."

Filmography

References

External links

Male actors from Tennessee
American male film actors
Living people
1960 births
Montreat College alumni
People from Knoxville, Tennessee
African-American male actors
American people of Cherokee descent
21st-century African-American people
20th-century African-American people